The Capocci were an Italian baronial family perhaps originally from Viterbo, who played a significant part in the affairs of the city, especially between the 12th and 14th centuries.

History
The first news of the family, which perhaps initially took the surname of Gasperini, date back to the second half of the 11th century.

Several members of the family have held illustrious positions, in particular Pietro and Nicola Capocci, who occupied the position of Cardinals. The family that in its period of maximum power enjoyed the possession of important fiefdoms including Monterotondo, Mentana, Montecelio and Sant'Angelo Romano, all in the region of present day Lazio. The Capocci lost their importance in the following centuries and became extinct in the 17th century.

References

Italian noble families